The 1977 Georgia Bulldogs football team represented the Georgia Bulldogs of the University of Georgia during the 1977 NCAA Division I football season.

Schedule

Roster

Game summaries

Ole Miss

Vanderbilt

References

Georgia
Georgia Bulldogs football seasons
Georgia Bulldogs football